Clarence "Butch" Edmund Avinger (December 15, 1928 – August 20, 2008) was a professional American football fullback and punter in the National Football League. At 6'1", 215–lb, Avinger was a 1st round selection (9th overall pick) of the Pittsburgh Steelers in the 1951 NFL Draft out of the University of Alabama where he had played quarterback. He only saw action in 1953 when he played for the New York Giants.

References

External links

Stats from pro-football-reference.com

1928 births
2008 deaths
People from Monroe County, Alabama
American football fullbacks
American football punters
Alabama Crimson Tide football coaches
Alabama Crimson Tide football players
New York Giants players
Saskatchewan Roughriders players
Players of American football from Alabama